Ramon Humber (born August 10, 1987) is a former American football linebacker. He was signed by the Indianapolis Colts as an undrafted free agent in 2009. He attended Champlin Park High School in Brooklyn Park, Minnesota, then played college football at North Dakota State.

Professional career

Indianapolis Colts
Humber led the Colts with 17 special teams tackles during 2009, and was active on special teams in that season's playoffs and Super Bowl.  In 2010, he was placed on injured reserve after two games with a broken hand, and was waived from injured reserve on November 9, 2010.

New Orleans Saints
The New Orleans Saints signed him on December 1.  He played in 13 games in 2011.  In 2012, he was suspended for the first three games of the season for a violation of the NFL substance abuse policy, then restored to the active roster. On February 8, 2016, Humber was released by the Saints.

New England Patriots
The New England Patriots signed Humber to a one-year contract on March 9, 2016. On August 30, 2016, Humber was released by the Patriots.

Buffalo Bills
On August 31, 2016, Humber was signed by the Buffalo Bills. He played in all 16 games, including one start. Most of his contributions during the 2016 season occurred on special teams, as he tied for the team lead with 12 special teams tackles.

On February 16, 2017, Humber re-signed with the Bills. On September 10, 2017, in the season opener against the New York Jets, he recorded a career-high 12 tackles in the 21–12 victory. He played in 13 games with nine starts, recording a career-high 89 tackles, which finished third on the team.

On March 20, 2018, Humber re-signed with the Bills on a one-year contract. He played in nine games before being released on November 10, 2018.

New England Patriots (second stint)
On November 14, 2018, Humber signed with the New England Patriots to a one-year deal. Humber appeared in 6 games for the Patriots. Humber finished the 2018 season with 9 tackles. Humber helped the Patriots reach Super Bowl LIII where they beat the Los Angeles Rams 13-3.

References

External links
New Orleans Saints bio
Indianapolis Colts bio
North Dakota State University bio

1987 births
Living people
People from Brooklyn Park, Minnesota
Players of American football from Minnesota
Sportspeople from the Minneapolis–Saint Paul metropolitan area
American football linebackers
North Dakota State Bison football players
Indianapolis Colts players
New Orleans Saints players
New England Patriots players
Buffalo Bills players